Pouvoirs (full title: Pouvoirs, revue d'études constitutionnelles et politiques) is a French political science journal that publishes academic articles relating to constitutional affairs. Lord Norton has described it as "the leading French journal of political science".

References

French-language journals